Intermediation involves the "matching" of lenders with savings to borrowers who need money by an agent or third party, such as a bank.  

If this matching is successful, the lender obtains a positive rate of return, the borrower receives a return for risk taking and entrepreneurship and the banker receives a return for making the successful match. If the borrower's speculative play with the funds provided by the bank does not pay off, the bank can face significant losses on its loan portfolio,  and if the bank fails its depositors can lose some of their money if the deposits are not insured by a third party.

The skill of identifying potential successful new entrepreneurs who can take market share off competitors or develop whole new markets is one of the most vital (and intangible) skills any banking system can possess. An unexpected form of entrepreneurship, and unintended consequence of microfinance initiatives, can be informal intermediation. That is, some entrepreneurial borrowers become informal intermediaries between microfinance initiatives and poorer micro-entrepreneurs. Those who more easily qualify for microfinance split loans into smaller credit to poorer borrowers. Informal intermediation ranges from casual intermediaries at the good or benign end of the spectrum to 'loan sharks' at the professional and sometimes criminal end of the spectrum. 

Disintermediation occurs when potential lenders and borrowers interact more directly in the capital markets, avoiding the intermediation of banks.

References

Banking